Czesław Antony Marchaj (9 July 1918 – 21 July 2015), often known in the West as C.A. Marchaj or Tony Marchaj, was a Polish-British yachtsman whose published scientific studies of the aerodynamics and hydrodynamics of sailing boats have been influential on yacht, sail and rig designers. He was the author of Sailing Theory and Practice and approximately 60 other publications on sailing. He was a member of the Royal Institute of Naval Architects (RINA), and he was awarded the Silver Medal of The International Sailing Federation (ISAF).

Early life and education
His original youth interest and professional career choice was aviation, with emphasis on gliding. After studying at the State Academy of Mechanical and Electrical Engineering in Warsaw, he joined the Warsaw University of Technology. Led wind tunnel testing of combat airplanes. During the German and Soviet occupation of Poland during World War II he was a soldier of the Polish Home Army (Armia Krajowa). Also, during the war years, Czesław Marchaj studied philosophy (clandestinely, as higher education was suppressed by occupation authorities) under Władysław Tatarkiewicz.

In the postwar years his interest had turned towards sailing. This resulted (in 1949) in a sentence in a politically motivated process to a prison term under false charges of espionage and "trying to escape to the West" and subsequent long term harassment.

Career
In 1953, drawing on his professional background in aerodynamics, Czeslaw Marchaj designed modifications (within class rules) to his Finn class racing boat and subsequently sailed it to a surprising win in a multiday Warsaw-Gdańsk river regatta. Asked by the Warsaw sailing clubs community about his race performance, he prepared and presented a series of lectures on sail aerodynamics during 1953/54 winter off-season. These lectures had been edited into the first version of the book Sailing Theory and Practice. This work had been well received and published in Poland and abroad.

On the strength of Sailing Theory and Practice, in 1969, Czesław Marchaj was granted a two-year scholarship by the University of Southampton. In 1970 he decided to live in the United Kingdom (which was considered defection by the Polish authorities and resulted in a long-term separation from his family, which was barred from leaving Poland to join him). In the years 1969-1990, Czesław Marchaj continued research at the University of Southampton and was a visiting lecturer at multiple top-ranking academic institutions. At the University of Southampton he pioneered wind tunnel testing of (scaled) sailing ships His work included books Aero-Hydrodynamics of Sailing (1979), Seaworthiness: The Forgotten Factor (1986) and Sail Performance: Techniques to Maximize Sail Power (1996). In 1979, after many boats were sunk with a loss of life in the Admirals Cup regatta Fastnet race Czesław Marchaj was commissioned to investigate the problem of dynamic instability of yachts in foul weather. He was also involved in the America's Cup competition bid preparations for the British team.

His books contain a rigorous theoretical and experimental approach to issues in the design and operation of sailing vessels, resulting in detailed analysis, confirmation or debunking of many previously assumed facts in sailing practice.

Later life
In the 1990s, Czesław Marchaj moved to a rural retreat in France. He died on 21 July 2015, aged 97.

Bibliography
 Sailing Theory and Practice, Adlard Coles Nautical, 1964, Library of Congress Catalogue Card Number 64-13694.
 Aero-hydrodynamics of sailing, 
 Aerodynamik und Hydrodynamik des Segelns, 
 Sail performance: techniques to maximize sail power, 
 Seaworthiness: the forgotten factor, 
 Teoria żeglowania: aerodynamika żagla, Alma-Press, Warszawa 2004, 
 Teoria żeglowania: aerodynamika żagla, 6th edition, Alma-Press, Warszawa 2009, 
 Dzielność morska: zapomniany czynnik , Alma-Press, Warszawa 2002,

References

Notes

External links
 Czesław Marchaj - Polish Sailing Encyclopedia 

1918 births
2015 deaths
Polish male sailors (sport)
People from Kraków County